Mihály is a Hungarian masculine given name, It is a cognate of the English Michael and may refer to:
Mihály András (1917–1993), Hungarian cellist, composer, and academic teacher
Mihály Apafi (1632–1690), Hungarian Prince of Transylvania
Mihály Babák (born 1947), Hungarian politician and member of the Hungarian National Assembly
Mihály Babits (1883– 1941), Hungarian poet, writer and translator 
Mihály Bakos (ca. 1742-1803), Hungarian-Slovene Lutheran priest, author, and educator
Mihály Balázs (born 1948), Hungarian historian and professor of religious history
Mihály Balla (born 1965) Hungarian politician and member of the Hungarian National Assembly
Mihály Barla (ca 1778–1824), Slovene evangelic pastor, writer and poet
Mihály Bertalanits (1788–1853), Slovene cantor, teacher, and poet in Hungary
Mihály Bíró (1914-????), Hungarian football forward 
Mihály Bozsi (1911–1984), Hungarian water polo player and Olympic medalist 
Mihály Csáky (ca. 1492–1572), Hungarian noble in the Principality of Transylvania and Chancellor of Transylvania 
Count Mihály Cseszneky de Milvány et Csesznek (15??-???), Hungarian nobleman and border castle hero in the 16th century
Mihály Csikszentmihalyi (born 1934), Hungarian psychology professor and educator
Mihály Csokonai Vitéz (1773-1805), Hungarian poet
Mihály Dávid (1886-1944), Hungarian track and field and Olympic medalist
Mihály Deák-Bárdos (born 1975), Hungarian amateur Greco-Roman wrestler and Olympic competitor 
Mihály Dömötör (1875–1962), Hungarian politician
Mihály Dresch (born 1955), Hungarian saxophone player
Mihály Erdélyi (1895–1979), Hungarian composer
Mihály Farkas (1904–1965), Hungarian communist politician
Mihály Fazekas (1766–1828), Hungarian writer and poet
Mihály Fekete (1884–1960), Hungarian actor, screenwriter and film director
Mihály Flaskay (born 1982), Hungarian breaststroke swimmer
Mihály Fülöp (1936–2006), Hungarian fencer and Olympic medalist 
Mihály Gáber (ca.  1753–1815), Slovene Roman Catholic priest and writer 
Mihály Hesz (born 1943), Hungarian sprint canoer and Olympic medalist
Mihály Horváth (1809–1878), Hungarian Roman Catholic bishop, historian, and politician
Mihály von Ibrányi (1895—1962), Hungarian officer during World War II 
Mihály Iglói (1908-1998), Hungarian track and field athlete, Olympic medalist and distance running coach
Mihály Imreffy(ca. 1460–1536), Hungarian soldier and noble
Mihály Iváncsik (born 1959), Hungarian handball player and Olympic competitor
Mihály Ivanicsics (1893–1968), Hungarian football player and referee
Mihály Lajos Jeney (1723/1724-1797), Hungarian military officer and mapmaker
Mihály Károlyi (1875–1955), Hungarian noble, politician, former Prime Minister and President
Mihály Káthay (ca. 1565–1607), Hungarian soldier and noble, Chancellor of Transylvania
Mihály Kincses (born 1918), Hungarian professional football player
Mihály Kolossa (1846–1906), Slovene ploughman and writer in Hungary
Mihály Korhut (born 1988), Hungarian football player
Mihály Korom (1927-1993), Hungarian politician and jurist
Mihály Kovács, (1818–1892), Hungarian painter
Mihály Kovács (born 1957), Hungarian handball player and Olympic competitor
Mihály Kozma (born 1949), Hungarian football midfielder and Olympic medalist
Mihály Kupa (born 1941), Hungarian politician
Mihály Lantos (1928–1989), Hungarian football player and manager and Olympic medalist
Mihály Lenhossék (1863-1937), Hungarian anatomist and histologist
Mihály Lombard de Szentábrahám (1683–1758), Hungarian Unitarian bishop
Mihály Lukács (1954–2012), Hungarian Romani politician, founding member of the Lungo Drom party
Mihály Makkai (born 1939), Hungarian-born Canadian mathematician 
Mihály Mayer (1933–2000), Hungarian water polo player and Olympic medalist
Mihály Mérey (ca. 1500–1572), Hungarian jurist and noble, Palatinal Governor in the Kingdom of Hungary
Mihály Mikes (????-1662), Hungarian noble, Chancellor of Transylvania
Mihály Mikes (????–1721), Hungarian landowner, aristocrat and politician
Mihály Mosonyi (1815–1870), Hungarian composer
Mihály Munkácsy (1844–1900), Hungarian painter
Mihály Nagymarosi (1919-2002), Hungarian football player
Mihály Pataki (1893–1977), Hungarian football player and Olympic competitor
Mihály Pollack (1773-1855), Hungarian architect
Mihály Rácz Rajna (born 1934), Hungarian stage actor
Mihály Sáfrán (born 1985), Hungarian sprint canoer and Olympic competitor
Mihály Salbeck (1709-1758), Hungarian Roman Catholic priest, philosopher and educator
Mihály Sasvári (born 1932), Hungarian sprint canoer 
Mihály Simai (born ????), Hungarian economist
Mihály Süvöltős (born 1949), Hungarian handball player and Olympic competitor
Mihály Székely (1901–1963), Hungarian operatic bass singer
Mihály Szemes (1920–1977), Hungarian film director
Mihály Szeróvay (born 1982), Hungarian football player
Mihály Szilágyi (ca. 1400–1460), Hungarian general and Regent of Hungary
Mihály Táncsics (1799-1884), Hungarian writer, teacher, journalist and politician
Mihály Tompa (1819–1868), Hungarian poet
Mihály Tóth (1926-1990), Hungarian football player
Mihály Tóth (born 1974), Hungarian football player
Mihály Vajda (born 1935), Hungarian philosopher and intellectual
Mihály Varga (born 1965), Hungarian politician
Mihály Vasas (born 1933), Hungarian football player and coach
Mihály Viczay (1757–1831), Hungarian numismatist, amateur archaeologist and collector
Mihály Víg (born 1957), Hungarian composer, poet, songwriter, guitarist and singer
Mihály Vörösmarty (1800-1855), Hungarian poet and dramatist
Mihály Zichy (1827-1906), Hungarian painter and graphic artist

Hungarian masculine given names